"My Funny Valentine" is a show tune from the 1937 Richard Rodgers and Lorenz Hart coming of age musical Babes in Arms in which it was introduced by teenaged star Mitzi Green. The song became a popular jazz standard, appearing on over 1300 albums performed by over 600 artists. One of them was Chet Baker, for whom it became his signature song. In 2015, it was announced that the Gerry Mulligan quartet featuring Chet Baker's version of the song was inducted into the Library of Congress's National Recording Registry for the song's "cultural, artistic and/or historical significance to American society and the nation’s audio legacy". Mulligan also recorded the song with his Concert Jazz Band in 1960.

History
Babes in Arms opened at the Shubert Theatre on Broadway, in New York City on April 14, 1937 and ran for 289 performances. In the original play, a character named Billie Smith (played by Mitzi Green) sings the song to Valentine "Val" LaMar (played by Ray Heatherton). The character's name was changed to match the lyric of this song.

In the song, Billie describes Valentine's characteristics in unflattering and derogatory terms (at one point Billie describes Valentine's looks as "laughable", in keeping with the title), but ultimately affirms that he makes her smile and that she doesn't want him to change. The description of Valentine was consistent with Lorenz Hart's own insecurities and belief that he was too short and ugly to be loved. (The lyrics are sufficiently gender-neutral to allow the song to be sung about a person of any gender, and a large proportion of cover versions of the song have been by men describing a hypothetical woman.)

Chart versions
The song first hit the charts in 1945, performed by Hal McIntyre with vocals by Ruth Gaylor. It only appeared for one week and hit No. 16.

See also
 List of 1930s jazz standards

References

Further reading
 
 
 
 
 
 
 

1937 songs
1930s jazz standards
Songs with music by Richard Rodgers
Songs with lyrics by Lorenz Hart
Ella Fitzgerald songs
Frank Sinatra songs
Johnny Mathis songs
Ronnie Milsap songs
Eartha Kitt songs
Andy Williams songs
Joe Dassin songs
Songs from Babes in Arms
Songs from Pal Joey (film)
Jazz compositions in B minor
Jazz compositions in C minor
American songs
Grammy Award for Best Instrumental Arrangement Accompanying Vocalist(s)
United States National Recording Registry recordings
Chaka Khan songs
Anita Baker songs
Chet Baker
Chet Baker songs